Pericycos is a genus of longhorn beetles of the subfamily Lamiinae, containing the following species:

 Pericycos fruhstorferi Breuning, 1957
 Pericycos guttatus (Heller, 1898)
 Pericycos philippinensis Breuning, 1944
 Pericycos princeps (Pascoe, 1878)
 Pericycos sulawensis Hüdepohl, 1990
 Pericycos teragramus Gilmour, 1950
 Pericycos varieguttatus (Schwarzer, 1926)

References

Lamiini